Vyacheslav Stanislavovych Koydan (born 5 July 1994) is a Ukrainian professional footballer who plays as a defensive midfielder.

Career 
He started his career at Yunist Chernihiv before moving to Dynamo Kyiv and bouncing around several amateur clubs between 2006 and 2013. In 2013 he signed with FC Chernihiv, where he played 22 games. He also played for UkrAhroKom Holovkivka and Oleksandriya before signing with Sumy in 2015. In 2017 he moved to Sandvikens in the Swedish Division 1.

Chernihiv 
In 2021 he moved to FC Chernihiv in the Ukrainian Second League. On 27 March he made his debut with the new team against Rubikon Kyiv at the Chernihiv Arena< On 18 April he scored his first goal by penalty against Obolon-2 at the Chernihiv Arena.

Olimpik Donetsk 
In summer 2021 he moved to Olimpik Donetsk in Ukrainian First League. On 25 July he played his first match with the new club against Kryvbas Kryvyi Rih, replacing Yuriy Hlushchuk in the 46th minute. On 18 August he played in the 2021–22 Ukrainian Cup against Livyi Bereh Kyiv. On 31 August he played in the next round against LNZ Cherkasy.

FC Chernihiv 
In January 2022 he signed with FC Chernihiv. On 22 August, following the club's promotion to the Ukrainian First League, he extended his contract with FC Chernihiv.

Career statistics

Club

Honours

Oleksandriya 
 Ukrainian First League: 2014–15

Individual 
 Top Scorer of FC Chernihiv on the season 2020–21 (3 goals)

References

External links 
 
 
 
 
 Härnösands FF Profile

1994 births
Living people
Footballers from Chernihiv
Ukrainian footballers
Association football midfielders
FC Yunist Chernihiv players
FC Retro Vatutine players
FC Chernihiv players
FC Dynamo Kyiv players
FC UkrAhroKom Holovkivka players
FC Oleksandriya players
PFC Sumy players
Härnösands FF players
Sandvikens IF players
FC Olimpik Donetsk players
Ukrainian First League players
Ukrainian Second League players
Ukrainian Amateur Football Championship players
Division 2 (Swedish football) players
Ettan Fotboll players
Ukrainian expatriate footballers
Expatriate footballers in Sweden
Ukrainian expatriate sportspeople in Sweden